Rasony is an urban-type settlement and the center of Rasony District, in the Vitebsk Region of Belarus.

References

Urban-type settlements in Belarus
Populated places in Vitebsk Region